The Island Packet 29 is an American sailboat that was designed by Robert K. Johnson as a cruiser and first built in 1981.

Production
The design was built by Island Packet Yachts in the United States, who produced 64 examples of the design between 1981 and 1997, but it is now out of production.

Design
The Island Packet 29 is a recreational keelboat, built predominantly of fiberglass, with teak and holly wood trim. It has a cutter rig or an optional masthead sloop rig, a raked stem, a vertical transom, a keel-mounted rudder controlled by a wheel with rack and pinion steering and a fixed long keel or optional fixed long keel with a centerboard. It displaces  and carries  of ballast.

The boat is fitted with an inboard diesel engine.

The U-shaped galley is located at the bottom of the companionway stairs on the starboard side and includes a gimballed two-burner liquid petroleum gas stove and a stainless steel sink with pressurized hot water. The head is located in the bow, just aft of the forward "V"-berth and it includes a shower. Additional sleeping accommodation includes a large cabin quarter berth aft, opposite the galley.

Ventilation is provided by nine opening ports, five deck hatches and two Dorade vents.

The boat has a bowsprit and the mast has twin backstays and a topping lift. The spars are all aluminum. The halyards are internally-mounted and dedicated halyard winches are provided. Additional winches are mounted for the jib sheets. The jib has Harken roller furling, while the mainsail has automatic winch reefing. There is a mainsheet traveler and a boom vang with an integral preventer is provided.

The factory standard sails provided included the main and a 125% genoa. The cutter sail, including a foresail boom and rigging were a factory option.

Operational history
In a review, Richard Sherwood noted, "the sleeping, fuel, and water capacity are indicators of the cruising capability of the 29, as is the full keel."

See also
List of sailing boat types

Similar sailboats
Alberg 29
Bayfield 29 
C&C 29
Cal 29
Hunter 29.5
Hunter 290
Mirage 29
Northwind 29
Tanzer 29
Watkins 29

References

Keelboats
1980s sailboat type designs
Sailing yachts
Sailboat type designs by Robert K. Johnson
Sailboat types built by Island Packet Yachts